Børge Møller Grimstrup (15 February 1906 – 30 October 1972) was a Danish film actor. He appeared in 26 films between 1948 and 1972. He was born in Timring, Herning Municipality, Denmark and died in Denmark.

Selected filmography
 Hr. Petit (1948)
 Father of Four in the City (1956)
 Flintesønnerne (1956)
 Charles' Aunt (1959)
 Reptilicus (1961)
 Støv på hjernen (1961)

External links

1906 births
1972 deaths
Danish male film actors
People from Herning Municipality
20th-century Danish male actors